Nahuel Rodríguez may refer to:

 Nahuel Rodríguez (footballer, born 1987), Argentine defender for Sportivo Belgrano
 Nahuel Rodríguez (footballer, born 1992), Argentine midfielder for Deportivo Achirense
 Nahuel Rodríguez (footballer, born 1996), Argentine midfielder for Deportivo Capiatá